Gabrielle Stone (born March 7, 1994) is an American water polo goalkeeper who is a member of the United States women's national water polo team. She was part of the gold medal-winning American team at the 2017 World Aquatics Championships in Budapest.

College career

Stone played water polo at Stanford University, where she helped the Cardinal win three NCAA Championships in 2014, 2015, and 2017. She postponed her senior season in order to train with the national team in preparation for the 2016 Summer Olympics, though she didn't make the final roster.

International career

Stone made her Senior National Team debut in 2017, winning the FINA World League Super Final.

References

External links
 
 
 Stanford Cardinal bio

Living people
1994 births
American female water polo players
World Aquatics Championships medalists in water polo
Stanford Cardinal women's water polo players
People from La Jolla, San Diego
Sportspeople from San Diego
Water polo goalkeepers